Ahmed Mumin Warfa was a Somali scientist specializing in botany, who with his colleague Mats Thulin discovered Cyclamen somalense. He served as president (rector) of the Zamzam University of Science and Technology from 2020 until his death.

Biography

Somalia

Warfa was a professor at the Somali National University, where he taught biology and agriculture. He also regularly conducted research with colleagues in Somalia, where he jointly discovered several endemic species, notably in the northeastern Bari region.

With the outbreak of the civil war in 1991 and the closure of the university, Ahmed became a peacemaker, working as a translator for the United Nations and setting up councils for the reconciliation process in Addis Ababa, Ethiopia. His efforts brought him into conflict with several local militia leaders. In 1994, he narrowly escaped an assassination attempt.

His children are Sumaya Mumin, Ismail Mumin, Daud Ahmed Mumin, Hibo Mumin, Farah Mumin, Mohamed Mumin, Aisha Mumin, Yusuf Mumin, Dahir Mumin, Halima Mumin, Fadumo Mumin, and Fadumo Mumin.

United States
Warfa subsequently left Somalia for Nairobi, Kenya, from where he then emigrated to the United States, where he taught biology at Salt Lake Community College and Brigham Young University in Utah. He continued to attend conferences on herbology as a keynote speaker or contributor.

Warfa was also actively involved in the affairs of Somalia and the Somali diaspora, whether as a reconciliator working for the UN and the Somali President or as an activist raising funds for projects such as Hiiraan University.

Back to Somalia 
In 2020, Warfa returned to Mogadishu to serve as rector of the Zamzam University of Science and Technology.

Professor Warfa died of complications from COVID-19 on 15 March 2021 in Mogadishu.

References

20th-century births
2021 deaths
Somalian scientists
Somalian non-fiction writers
Academic staff of Somali National University
Deaths from the COVID-19 pandemic in Somalia
20th-century botanists
21st-century botanists
Year of birth missing